The 2009 Indian general election polls in Chhattisgarh were held for eleven seats in the state. Ten seats were won by  the Bharatiya Janata Party for the National Democratic Alliance and one by the Indian National Congress for the United Progressive Alliance in first-past-the-post elections. Voting in the state took place on 16 April. The election was marred by Naxalite violence in several of the state's constituencies. Out of approximately 15.4 million eligible voters 55.29 percent exercised their right to vote.

Result

References

Chhattisgarh
Indian general elections in Chhattisgarh
2000s in Chhattisgarh